Miners' Welfare Park is the premier urban park in Bedworth, Warwickshire, England.

History

This park was originally purchased by Bedworth Miners' Welfare Committee in 1921 to offer recreation to the miners and their families.  A winding wheel was erected in the park as a tribute to the miners in 1986. In 2000 it won 'Best Park in the UK' in the Britain in Bloom competition. It is now managed by Nuneaton and Bedworth Borough Council.

Facilities
There is a children's play area with a water splash area, a sand pit and a green play area for sensory play. There are formal gardens, a skate park, outdoor gym, disc golf, walking paths, cricket, football, pitch and putt golf, bowls, a lake, pond and wildflower area. Bedworth leisure centre is at the park offering a swimming pool, gym and other indoor sport activities. Bedworth Parkrun takes place every Saturday morning at 9am, the course is 5km in length and run on a mixture of footpaths.

References

Parks and open spaces in Warwickshire
Bedworth